"Grey Street" is the third and final radio single from Dave Matthews Band from their 2002 studio album, Busted Stuff. The first known recording of the song appears on the unofficially-released The Lillywhite Sessions, produced by Steve Lillywhite. The song revolves around the story of a girl who is consumed with feelings of loneliness, boredom and powerlessness.  Color—and the lack thereof—are motifs in the song.

Track listing
"Grey Street" (rock remix) - 4:28
"Grey Street" (album version) - 5:06

Charts

References

External links
Song History

Dave Matthews Band songs
2002 singles
Songs written by Dave Matthews
2002 songs
RCA Records singles